Basrik (also Romanized as Başrīk; also known as Bīsrak) is a village in Targavar Rural District, Silvaneh District, Urmia County, West Azerbaijan Province, Iran. At the 2006 census, its population was 142, in 25 families.

References 

Populated places in Urmia County